Sonni Gwanle Tyoden (born 22 September 1950) is a Nigerian  Professor of  Political Science, Educational Administrator, and former Vice Chancellor of the University of Jos.

Education
Tyoden was born on 22 September 1950. He attended Boys Secondary School, Gindiri in Plateau State, Northern Nigeria, where he obtained the West Africa Senior School Certificate. He later proceeded to the University of Ibadan where he obtained a Bachelor  of Science (B.Sc) Degree in Political Science. He obtained a Master of Science (M.Sc) and a Doctorate (Ph.D) Degree  in International Relations and Political Economy from the University of Lancaster in the United Kingdom.

Career
Tyoden began his career in 1978, as an Assistant Secretary to Plateau State Government Ministry of Establishment. He later became a member of academic staff at the University of Jos, where he became a full Professor in 1990. After Tyoden became a Professor in 1990, he was appointed, Head of the Department of Political Science, University of Abuja
He returned to his alma mater, the University of Jos in 2000, and became Dean of the Faculty of Social Sciences in 2001, a position he held till 2005.
He was appointed Vice Chancellor of the University of Jos on 12 July 2006, a position he held until 11 June 2011. He contributed significantly to the development of the University.
He was elected as Deputy Governor of Plateau State in 2015 under the platform of the APC.

Awards and fellowships 

 Certificate of Merit awarded by the Academic Staff Union of Universities (ASUU), University of Jos branch 
 The Distinguished Academic Leadership award by the Rotary Club Naraguta, Jos, Plateau state, 
 The Nigerian Institute of International Affairs in 2013 
 The Social Science Academy of Nigeria in December 2014.

Selected publications 

 Inter and intra-party relations: towards a more stable party system in Nigeria.
The Kaduna Mafia. Jos: Jos Univer-sity Press. TakuyaThe Kaduna Mafia1987.
The middle belt in Nigerian politics. AHA.
Of Citizens and Citizens: The Dilemma of Citizenship in Nigeria.
Tyoden, S. G. (1994). The Place of the Middle Belt in Nigeria's Power Equation. In Commission paper for the National Conference on" The Equity Question in Nigeria", Centre for Development Studies, University of Jos, 6–7 May. 
The Kaduna Mafia. Jos University Press.
Nigeria: Youth agenda for the 21st century. Sibon Books.
The Domestic Socio-Political Situation This includes, the nature of the political system, and the nature and conduct of the politics and government In other words, in a political system where the political. Towards the Survival of the Third Republic, 203.
Vice Chancellor's Speech: Presented at the 24th Convocation Ceremony of the University of Jos.
Towards a Progressive Nigeria. Triumph Publishing Company.

See also
List of vice chancellors in Nigeria
University of Jos

References

1950 births
Living people
Nigerian educators
University of Ibadan alumni
Alumni of Lancaster University
Academic staff of the University of Jos
Vice-Chancellors of Nigerian universities
All Progressives Congress politicians
People from Plateau State